Ypsolopha colleaguella is a moth of the family Ypsolophidae. It is known from the Volga River valley in southern Russia and Kazakhstan (the area of the lower Irtysz River near the Chinese border).

The wingspan is 17.5–19.5 mm. The forewings are lanceolate and two-coloured. The division line between the two colours runs along the white narrow band passing in the half of its width from the base to the external margin. The part adjusted to the costal margin is white, but sometimes tinged dark-brown scales. The fragment adjusted to the rear margin is dark grey with a narrow whitish streak at the dorsum. There are irregularly distributed small dark dots over the whole area of the wing. The fringes are three-coloured and the colour of a given part matches that of the corresponding part of the wing. The hindwings are white-grey at the base and in the middle part, but distinctly dark grey at the apex. The fringes are of the same colour. The thorax is white-grey and the abdomen is white with a few grey scales. The legs are covered with two-coloured white-grey adherent scales.

Etymology
The name is a dedication to the friends of the author who helped in his work on Ypsolophidae.

References

Ypsolophidae
Moths of Asia
Moths described in 2007